The timeline of particle physics lists the sequence of particle physics theories and discoveries in chronological order. The most modern developments follow the scientific development of the discipline of particle physics.

19th century
 1815 – William Prout hypothesizes that all matter is built up from hydrogen, adumbrating the proton;
 1838 – Richard Laming hypothesized a subatomic particle carrying electric charge;
 1858 – Julius Plücker produced cathode rays;
 1874 – George Johnstone Stoney hypothesizes a minimum unit of electric charge. In 1891, he coins the word electron for it;
 1886 – Eugen Goldstein produced anode rays;
 1897 – J. J. Thomson discovered the electron;
 1899 – Ernest Rutherford discovered the alpha and beta particles emitted by uranium;
 1900 – Paul Villard discovered the gamma ray in uranium decay.

20th century
 1905 – Albert Einstein hypothesized the photon to explain the photoelectric effect.
 1911 – Hans Geiger, Ernest Marsden and Ernest Rutherford discovered the nucleus of an atom;
 1919 – Ernest Rutherford discovered the proton;
 1927 – Charles Drummond Ellis (along with James Chadwick and colleagues) finally establish clearly that the beta decay spectrum is in fact continuous and not discrete, posing a problem that will later be solved by theorizing (and later discovering) the existence of the neutrino.
 1928 – Paul Dirac postulated the existence of positrons as a consequence of the Dirac equation;
 1930 – Wolfgang Pauli postulated the neutrino to explain the energy spectrum of beta decays;
 1932 – James Chadwick discovered the neutron;
 1932 – Carl D. Anderson discovered the positron;
 1935 – Hideki Yukawa predicted the existence of mesons as the carrier particles of the strong nuclear force;
 1936 – Carl D. Anderson discovered the muon while he studied cosmic radiation;
 1947 – George Dixon Rochester and Clifford Charles Butler discovered the kaon, the first strange particle;
 1947 – Cecil Powell, César Lattes and Giuseppe Occhialini discovered the pion;
 1955 – Owen Chamberlain, Emilio Segrè, Clyde Wiegand, and Thomas Ypsilantis discovered the antiproton;
 1955 and 1956 – Murray Gell-Mann and Kazuhiko Nishijima independently derive the Gell-Mann–Nishijima formula, which relates the baryon number, the strangeness, and the isospin of hadrons to the charge, eventually leading to the systematic categorization of hadrons and, ultimately, the quark model of hadron composition.
 1956 – Clyde Cowan and Frederick Reines discovered the (electron) neutrino;
 1957 – Bruno Pontecorvo postulated the flavor oscillation;
 1962 – Leon M. Lederman, Melvin Schwartz and Jack Steinberger discovered the muon neutrino;
 1962 – Murray Gell-Mann and Yuval Ne'eman independently classify the hadrons according to a system that Gell-Mann called the Eightfold Way, and which ultimately led to the quark model (1964) of hadron composition.
 1963 – Nicola Cabibbo develops the mathematical matrix by which the first two (and ultimately three) generations of quarks can be predicted.
 1964 – Murray Gell-Mann and George Zweig independently propose the quark model of hadrons, predicting the arbitrarily named up, down, and strange quarks. Gell-Mann is credited with coining the term quark, which he found in James Joyce's book Finnegans Wake.
 1964 – François Englert, Robert Brout, Peter Higgs, Gerald Guralnik, C. R. Hagen, and Tom Kibble postulate that a fundamental quantum field, now called the Higgs field, permeates space and, by way of the Higgs mechanism, provides mass to all the elementary subatomic particles that interact with it. While the Higgs field is postulated to confer mass on quarks and leptons, it represents only a tiny portion of the masses of other subatomic particles, such as protons and neutrons. In these, gluons that bind quarks together confer most of the particle mass. The result is obtained independently by three groups: François Englert and Robert Brout; Peter Higgs, working from the ideas of Philip Anderson; and Gerald Guralnik, C. R. Hagen, and Tom Kibble.
 1964 – Sheldon Glashow and James Bjorken predict the existence of the charm quark. The addition is proposed because it allows for a better description of the weak interaction (the mechanism that allows quarks and other particles to decay), equalizes the number of known quarks with the number of known leptons, and implies a mass formula that correctly reproduced the masses of the known mesons.
 1967 – Bruno Pontecorvo postulated neutrino oscillation;
 1967 – Steven Weinberg and Abdus Salam publish papers in which they describe Yang–Mills theory using the SU(2) X U(1) supersymmetry group, thereby yielding a mass for the W particle of the weak interaction via spontaneous symmetry breaking.
 1968 – Stanford University: Deep inelastic scattering experiments at the Stanford Linear Accelerator Center (SLAC) show that the proton contains much smaller, point-like objects and is therefore not an elementary particle. Physicists at the time are reluctant to identify these objects with quarks, instead calling them partons — a term coined by Richard Feynman. The objects that are observed at SLAC will later be identified as up and down quarks. Nevertheless, "parton" remains in use as a collective term for the constituents of hadrons (quarks, antiquarks, and gluons). The existence of the strange quark is indirectly validated by the SLAC's scattering experiments: not only is it a necessary component of Gell-Mann and Zweig's three-quark model, but it provides an explanation for the kaon (K) and pion (π) hadrons discovered in cosmic rays in 1947.
 1970 – Glashow, John Iliopoulos and Luciano Maiani predict the charmed quark that is subsequently found experimentally and share a Nobel prize for their theoretical prediction.
 1973 – Frank Anthony Wilczek discover the quark asymptotic freedom in the theory of strong interactions; receives the Lorentz Medal in 2002, and the Nobel Prize in Physics in 2004 for his discovery and his subsequent contributions to quantum chromodynamics.
 1973 – Makoto Kobayashi and Toshihide Maskawa note that the experimental observation of CP violation can be explained if an additional pair of quarks exist. The two new quarks are eventually named top and bottom.
 1974 – Burton Richter and Samuel Ting: Charm quarks are produced almost simultaneously by two teams in November 1974 (see November Revolution) — one at SLAC under Burton Richter, and one at Brookhaven National Laboratory under Samuel Ting. The charm quarks are observed bound with charm antiquarks in mesons. The two discovering parties independently assign the discovered meson two different symbols, J and ψ; thus, it becomes formally known as the J/ψ meson. The discovery finally convinces the physics community of the quark model's validity.
 1975 – Martin Lewis Perl, with his colleagues at the SLAC–LBL group, detects the tau in a series of experiments between 1974 and 1977.
 1977 – Leon Lederman observes the bottom quark with his team at Fermilab. This discovery is a strong indicator of the top quark's existence: without the top quark, the bottom quark would be without a partner that is required by the mathematics of the theory.
 1977 – Martin Lewis Perl discovered the tau lepton after a series of experiments;
 1979 – Gluon observed indirectly in three-jet events at DESY;
 1983 – Carlo Rubbia and Simon van der Meer discovered the W and Z bosons;
 1995 – The top quark is finally observed by a team at Fermilab after an 18-year search. It has a mass much greater than had been previously expected — almost as great as a gold atom.
 1998 – The Super-Kamiokande (Japan) detector facility reports experimental evidence for neutrino oscillations, implying that at least one neutrino has mass.

21st century
 2000 – Tau neutrino proved distinct from other neutrinos at Fermilab;
 2000 – CERN announced quark-gluon plasma, a new phase of matter.
 2000 - scientists at FermiLab announce the first direct evidence for the tau neutrino, the third kind of neutrino in particle physics.
 2001 – the Sudbury Neutrino Observatory (Canada) confirm the existence of neutrino oscillations. Lene Hau stops a beam of light completely in a Bose–Einstein condensate.
 2005 – the RHIC accelerator of Brookhaven National Laboratory generates a "perfect" fluid, perhaps the quark–gluon plasma.
 2012 – Higgs boson-like particle discovered at CERN's Large Hadron Collider (LHC).

See also
 Chronology of the universe
 Particle physics
 Timeline of cosmological theories
 Timeline of particle physics technology

References

Particle physics
Particle physics